Combined diesel and diesel (CODAD) is a propulsion system for ships using two diesel engines to power a single propeller shaft. A gearbox and clutches enable either of the engines or both of them together to drive the shaft.  Two advantages over simply using a single, larger diesel engine of the same total power output are that (1) diesel engines have somewhat better specific fuel consumption at 75% to 85% max output than they do at only 50% output, and (2) there is a weight and size advantage to using two higher-speed engines compared to a single lower-speed engine, even with the slightly larger gearbox system.

CODAD vessels 
 Guaicamacuto-class patrol boat
 Type 31 frigate
 Steregushchiy-class corvette
 Jose Rizal-class frigate
 Frégates de taille intermédiaire
 Type 054A Frigate
 Doha-class corvette
 MV Piano Land (formerly MV Oriana)
 M/F Povl Anker

References

Marine propulsion
Marine diesel engines